Michael McGoldrick (born 26 November 1971, in Manchester, England) is a folk musician who plays Irish flute, uilleann pipes, low whistle and bodhran. He also plays other instruments such as acoustic guitar, cittern, and mandolin.

Bands
McGoldrick has been a member of several influential bands. In 1994 he was awarded the BBC Young Tradition Award, and in 2001 he was given the Instrumentalist of the Year award at the BBC Radio 2 Folk Awards.

McGoldrick was a founder-member of the Celtic rock band Toss the Feathers while still at school. He also competed at that time in the Fleadhanna with Dezi Donnelly (fiddle) and John Joe Kelly (bodhrán), whom he had met at local Comhaltas meetings. He made appearances at various local and national festivals and ran whistle/flute workshops at the Cambridge Folk Festival and for Folkworks on their "Flutopia" concert tour.

McGoldrick formed the band Fluke! (later renamed as Flook) with Brian Finnegan and Sarah Allen in November 1995. After one tour, he left to pursue other projects.

He was an early member of Lúnasa from 1997 until roughly 2000 and played on their first albums. He also joined Capercaillie in 1998, playing on six albums (one live) to date.

McGoldrick has played regularly for Afro-Celt Sound System and Kate Rusby's band.  he leads the Michael McGoldrick Band.

Between 1996 and the present, McGoldrick recorded five solo albums, all featuring an array of well-known supporting musicians: Morning Rory (1996) showcases his traditional skills. Fused, released in August 2000, explores several other musical genres including jazz; although Wired, released in January 2006, takes the experimental approach of Fused even further, it was preceded by a duo album At First Light (2001), with award-winning uilleann piper John McSherry (also ex-Lúnasa) which goes back to traditional roots. Aurora, released in 2010, features traditional as well as self-penned tunes, and a song (Waterbound) by a Louisiana master of old-time music, Dirk Powell. McGoldrick's latest solo release is Arc (2018). 

Between 2007 and 2013 McGoldrick played with the house band for the Transatlantic Sessions (Sessions 3-6) including performing some of his own compositions/arrangements.

In 2010 Michael replaced John McCusker, joining Tim O'Brien on Mark Knopfler's US leg of the Get Lucky Tour. This being a success, he was invited (and accepted) to stay on for the remainder of the World Tour in Europe when John McCusker had returned. He went on to play on the next Mark Knopfler album, Privateering and played with the band for the subsequent World Tour. McGoldrick also recorded for the 'Ceol Tacsi' project with many other British and Irish artists.

Album discography

Solo/duo/trio
Champions of the North (with Dezi Donnelly) - Bop Cassettes (1990)
Morning Rory – Aughgrim Records AUGH01 (1996)
Fused – Vertical Records VERTCD051 (2000)
At First Light (with John McSherry) – Vertical Records VERTCD061 (2001)
Wired – Vertical Records VERTCD074 (2005)
Aurora – Vertical Records VERTCD090 (2010)
Live (with John McCusker & John Doyle, 2009 tour) – Vertical Records (2012)
The Mark Radcliffe Folk Sessions (with John McCusker & John Doyle) - Smooth Operations (2016)
The Wishing Tree (with John McCusker & John Doyle, studio album) – Under One Sky Records UOSR004 (2018)
 Arc - Vertical Records VERTCD111 (2018)
Dog in the Fog (with Dezi Donnelly) - Boxroom Music (2018)
Mike McGoldrick & John Doyle - Boxroom Music (2020)
Waterman's (Live) - Vertical Records (2020)
The Reed That Bends in the Storm (with John McCusker & John Doyle) - Under One Sky Records (2020)
Christmas at Home (with John McCusker & John Doyle) - (2020)
At Home This Spring (Live) (with John McCusker & John Doyle) - (2021)
 At Our Leisure (with John Carty) - (2022)

As band member of

Toss the Feathers 
 Live at the 32 - Bop Cassettes (1988)
Rude Awakening (1993)
The Next Round (1995)

Arcady 
Many Happy Returns – Dara Records DARACD080 (1995)

Flook 
Flook! Live!  – Small CD 9405 (1996)

Capercaillie 
 Beautiful Wasteland - Survival Records (1997)
Dawn Till Dusk (The Best of Capercaillie) - Survival Records (1998)
 Nàdurra - Survival Records (2000)
 Live in Concert - Survival Records (2002)
 Choice Language - Vertical Records (2003)
Grace And Pride: The Anthology 1984-2004 - Survival Records (2004)
 Roses and Tears - Vertical Records (2008)
At the Heart of It All - Vertical Records (2013)

Lúnasa 
 Lúnasa - Self-released (1998)
 Otherworld - Green Linnet (1999)
The Story So Far... - Compass Records (2008)

Kate Rusby 
Hourglass  – Compass Records (1997)
Cowsong – Pure Records (1998)
Sleepless  – Compass Records (1999)
Little Lights  – Pure Records (2001)
Withered And Died - Pure Records (2001)
10 - Pure Records (2002)
Underneath The Stars - Pure Records (2003)
The Girl Who Couldn't Fly - Pure Records (2005)
Awkward Annie - Pure Records (2007)
20 - Pure Records, Mighty Village, & Island Records (2012)
Ghost - Pure Records (2014)
Life in a Paper Boat - Pure Records (2016)

Eden's Bridge 

 All in a Life - Straightway Records (2000)
 Isle of Tides - Whole World Media Group (2002)
New Celtic Worship - Whole World Media Group (2005)

Celtic Melt 

 Celtic Melt - Cavendish Music Library (2002)

Sharon Shannon, Frankie Gavin / Dezi Donnelly, Jim Murray 
Tunes – Compass Records (2005)
Upside Down – The Daisy Label (2006)
Renegade – The Daisy Label (2007)

Future Trad Collective 

 Future Trad Collective - Vertical Records (2011)

Usher's Island 

 Usher's Island - Vertical Records (2017)

As guest artist/other
Straight on No Problem - Anthony John Clarke (1997)
Spellbound - Ten (1998)
1 Douar - Alan Stivell (1998)
Volume 1: The Source - Big Sky (1999)
Volume 2: Release - Afro Celt Sound System (1999)
Identités - Idir (1999)
Seal Maiden - Karan Casey (2000)
Yella Hoose - John McCusker (2000)
New Celtic Music From Green Linnet - Various (2000)
Ceol Tacsi - Various (2000)
Two Journeys - Tim O'Brien (2001)
The Wind Begins To Sing - Karan Casey (2001)
Live Recordings From The William Kennedy Piping Festival - Various (2002)
50 US Cents - Reel & Soul Association (2002)
Warm & Tender Love (Single) - Reel & Soul Association (2002)
The Acoustic Folk Box - Various (2002)
Through the Round Window - Eamonn Coyne (2002)
Time To Fall - Karen Matheson (2002)
Distant Shore - Karan Casey (2003)
What Road? - Session A9 (2003)
If Not Now - e2K (2003)
The Arms Dealer's Daughter - Shooglenifty (2004)
Musical Tour of New Zealand - Billy Connolly (2004)
Movin''' - Human Touch (2004)Shots - Damien Dempsey (2005)ZOOM ZOOM ZOOM - Aquarium (2005)Wayward Son - John Doyle (2005)Downriver - Karen Matheson (2005)Strategy - Horace X (2005)Earthsongs - Secret Garden (2005)The Essential Collection 1995–2005 - Ten (2005)Hands Across The Water - Various (2005)Folktopia - Music of Vertical Records, Vol. 1 - Various (2005)The Furthest Wave - Cathie Ryan (2005)Raining Up - Máiréad (2005)My Secret Is My Silence - Roddy Woomble (2006)The Seventh Veil - Theresa Kavanagh (2006)Live Acoustic at the Jam House - Ocean Colour Scene (2006)The Songs of The Radio Ballads - Various (2006) Og Mhadainn Shamhraidh - Kathleen MacInnes (2006)Música na Maleta - Tejedor (2006)Peacetime - Eddi Reader (2007)Cuilidh - Julie Fowlis (2007)
Prism - Beth Nielsen Chapman (2007)Across The Black River - Kevin Burke & Cal Scott (2007)Before the Ruin - Kris Drever, John McCusker & Roddy Woomble (2008)Yella House + Goodnight Ginger - John McCusker (2008)In Love + Love - Heidi Talbot (2008)Border Reiver (Single) - Mark Knopfler (2009)Imeall - Mairéad Ní Mhaonaigh (2009)Get Lucky - Mark Knopfler (2009)Wells For Zoë - Water For Life - Various (2009)Exiles Return - John Doyle and Karan Casey (2010)On the Move - Colin Farrell (2010)Bretonne - Nolwenn Leroy (2010)Summer Hill - Damien O'Kane (2010)Last Star - Heidi Talbot (2010)Capture 1995-2010 - Afro Celt Sound System (2010)Get Lucky in London - Mark Knopfler (2010)
Transatlantic Sessions - Series 4: Volume 2 - Jerry Douglas, Aly Bain, & Various (2010)Transatlantic Sessions - Series 4: Volume 3 - Jerry Douglas, Aly Bain, & Various (2010)
Transatlantic Sessions - Series 5: Volume 1 - Jerry Douglas, Aly Bain, & Various (2011)Shadow And Light - John Doyle (2011) Out on the Edge - Chris Dawson (2011) Privateering (Mark Knopfler) (2012)Ô Filles De L'Eau - Nolwenn Leroy (2012)All The Way Home - Cathy Jordan (2012)Only Boys Aloud - Only Boys Aloud (2012)Chimes of Freedom: The Songs of Bob Dylan - Various (2012)
Hammersmith 2011 - Mark Knopfler (2012)Die Wanderhure - Best Of - Stephan Massimo (2012)The Sailor's Revenge - Bap Kennedy (2012)Five And Twenty - Aly Bain & Phil Cunningham (2012)Angels Without Wings - Heidi Talbot (2013)These Wilder Things - Ruth Moody (2013)Tierra - Vicente Amigo (2013)Полная Дискография - Aquarium (2013)Gach Sgeul - Every Story - Julie Fowlis (2014)Homecoming - A Scottish Fantasy - Nicole Benedetti (2014)
Transatlantic Session - Series 6: Volume 3 - Jerry Douglas, Aly Bain, & Various (2014)Make a Note - Colin Farrell (2015)Tracker - Mark Knopfler (2015)JEKYLL + HYDE - Zac Brown Band (2015)Encore Heureux - Zazie (2015)Complicated Game - James McMurty (2015)Urram - Karen Matheson (2015)Katie Morag (Music from the BBC Series) - Donald Shaw (2015)The Widening Gyre - Altan (2015)Vagabond - Eddi Reader (2015)My Secret Is My Silence - Roddy Woombie (2016)
Altamira - Mark Knopfler & Evelyn Glennie (2016)Hello Goodbye - John McCusker (2016)Doolin' - Doolin' (2016)The Seven Suns - John McSherry (2016)Alterum - Julie Fowlis (2017)Pretty Little Troubles - Malcolm Holcombe (2017)Searbh Siúcra - Éilís Crean (2017)Pretty Peg - Sam Kelly & The Lost Boys (2017)Celtic Colours Live, Vol. 5 - Various (2017)Cavalier - Eddi Reader (2018)
 Folk Fever - The Band of Love (2018)
 The Art of Forgetting - Kyle Carey (2018)Banjophony - Damien O'Kane & Ron Block (2018)Down the Road Wherever - Mark Knopfler (2018)Basque Selfie - Korrontzi (2018)Love Is The Bridge Between Two Hearts - Heidi Talbot & John McCusker (2018)Down The Road Wherever in Concert 2019 Tour Compilation - Mark Knopfler (2019)Quarehawk - Michael Walsh (2019)La Lluz Encesa - Llan de Cubel (2019)The Path of Stones - John Doyle (2020)Simply Whistle - Pat Walsh (2020)Glackanacker - The Black Brothers (2020)When I Wait For You - Dirk Powell (2020)Songs for the Sparrows - Nefesh Mountain (2021)Blue Shaman - Abaji (2021)I Got Rhythm'' - Tim Edey (2021)

References

External links

 

1971 births
Living people
Celtic fusion musicians
Musicians from Manchester
British flautists
Irish flautists
Capercaillie (band) members
Flook (band) members
Lúnasa (band) members
Usher's Island (band) members
Vertical Records artists